Picket Post is a road junction and service area in the New Forest National Park of Hampshire, England. It lies on the A31 road.

Facilities
Picket Post is located on the A31 dual carriageway which passes through the New Forest. It is situated 2.5 miles from the A338 at Ringwood and 8 miles from Junction 1 of the M27 at Cadnam. A minor road to the village of Burley joins with the A31 at Picket Post. There is a roadside service area on both sides of the dual carriageway.

Picket Post is the location of a cricket ground for Ellingham cricket club, and there is a rugby training pitch next to it.

History
Picket Post was once an important junction of the toll road to Poole with the road to Burley and Lymington. The name derives from a picket (i.e. a post) which marked the spot, but it may have acquired a second meaning from a picket of soldiers stationed at a strategic point on the smugglers's route. There was an inn here for most of the 19th century, which around 1900 became a tea house whose sign was a large golden kettle - it was demolished in 1969.

References

External links

Road junctions in England